The Mendoza Line is baseball jargon for a .200 batting average, the supposed minimum threshold for competence at the Major League level. It derives from light-hitting shortstop Mario Mendoza, who failed to reach .200 five times in his nine big league seasons. When a position player's batting average falls below .200, the player is said to be "below the Mendoza Line".

Origin
Mendoza, a lightly used shortstop from Chihuahua, Mexico, played for three franchises during his Major League career. While his fielding was adequate, his hitting was not. His batting average was between .180 to .199 in three of his first four seasons in the big leagues (1974 to 1977).

When he again had trouble staying above .200 in 1979 teammates began to chide him. "...Tom Paciorek and Bruce Bochte used it to make fun of me," Mendoza said in 2010. "Then they were giving George Brett a hard time because he had a slow start that year, so they told him, 'Hey, man, you're going to sink down below the Mendoza Line if you're not careful.' And then Brett mentioned it to Chris Berman from ESPN, and eventually it spread and became a part of the game." 

Berman deflects credit back to Brett in popularizing the term. "Mario Mendoza? It’s all George Brett," Berman said. "We used it all the time in those 1980s SportsCenters. It was just a humorous way to describe how someone was hitting."

Mendoza ended up finishing 1979 below his own "line", at .198.  His hitting improved modestly in 1980 and 1981, enough that even with another sub-.200 in his final season of 1982 he was able to raise his career batting average to .215.

Similar term
Another term used in baseball to indicate that a hitter is hitting below the Mendoza Line is that he is "on the interstate".  It derives from the syntax of the U.S.
Interstate Highway System, which begins with the abbreviation "I" for "Interstate", followed by two numerals for major routes - such as "I-95" and "I-80", expressions which superficially resemble sub-.200 batting averages."

Use outside of baseball
The term is also used outside of baseball to convey a similar connotation of unacceptably subpar performance:
 "The U.S. 10-year note yield declined below 2%... before moving back above the Mendoza Line... to 2.09% by early afternoon."
 "A sub-$2,000 per theater average... is the Mendoza Line of box office numbers..."
 "Republican pollster Neil Newhouse... argues that these numbers have crossed below the political 'Mendoza line'..."
 On an episode of How I Met Your Mother, Barney explains the "Vicky Mendoza Diagonal" line, which determines how attractive a girl must be in order for him to date her depending on how "crazy" she is.
 In an episode of Beverly Hills, 90210, Brandon and Steve's professor says "And look, if you've done the reading you don't have to worry, you will not fall below the Mendoza Line for a grade of a C." to which a student asks "Umm, the Mendoza Line? Was that in the chapters?"
Then-Cincinnati Bengals quarterback Andy Dalton's play was described as defining the "Dalton Line", the minimum level of performance expected of a starting  quarterback in the National Football League.
 In Boston, MA, "The Mendoza Line" is a weekly independent comedy show at The Dugout Cafe that was started in 2014 and has won Boston A-List's "Best Night of Comedy"

References

Further reading

 
 

Batting statistics
Baseball terminology
Metaphors referring to sport